Pavel Dobrý (born 1 February 1976) is a Czech footballer who plays for SpVgg Lam. He played one season in the Gambrinus liga for Viktoria Plzeň in the 1998–99 season.

References

External links
 

1976 births
Living people
Czech footballers
Czech First League players
FC Viktoria Plzeň players
SC Paderborn 07 players
1. FC Magdeburg players
Holstein Kiel players
Dynamo Dresden players
Chemnitzer FC players
3. Liga players
Expatriate footballers in Germany
Association football forwards
People from Klatovy
Sportspeople from the Plzeň Region